The Stage Hand is a 1920 American silent short comedy film featuring Oliver Hardy.

Cast
 Larry Semon as The Stage Hand
 Lucille Carlisle as The Leading Lady
 Frank Alexander as The Stage Manager
 Thelma Percy as The Animal Trainer
 Al Thompson as The Show Manager
 William Hauber as Props
 Jack Duffy as The Hero
 Frank Hayes as The Prima Donna
 Oliver Hardy as Audience member (uncredited)

See also
 List of American films of 1920

External links

1920 films
American silent short films
American black-and-white films
1920 comedy films
1920 short films
Films directed by Norman Taurog
Films directed by Larry Semon
Silent American comedy films
American comedy short films
1920s American films